KK Jedinstvo is a professional basketball club from Bijelo Polje, Montenegro. The team currently competes in First Erste League. A school for all ages and categories has been organized within the club.

See also
 ŽKK Jedinstvo Bijelo Polje

External links 
 Eurobasket.com KK Jedinstvo BP Page

Jedinstvo